A constitutional referendum was held in Liberia on 3 May 1955. The changes to the constitution would grant women in the Provinces the right to vote (other women had been granted the right to vote in a 1946 referendum), grant all women the right to be elected to Parliament, and remove the section detailing that the Chief Justice would oversee any impeachment of the President or Vice-President. The changes were approved by voters.

Constitutional change
The proposed changes would be to Chapters I and II.

A two-thirds majority in the vote was necessary for the changes to be approved.

References

Liberia
Constitutional referendum
Referendums in Liberia
Constitutional referendums in Liberia
Liberia